Saint George of Vienne was bishop of Vienne in France in the 7th century. He may previously have been bishop of Agde. His year of death is uncertain: both c. 670 and 699 have been suggested.

He was canonised in 1251. His feast day is celebrated on 2 November.

References 

7th-century deaths
Year of birth unknown
Year of death unknown
Bishops of Vienne
Bishops of Agde
7th-century Christian saints
Gallo-Roman saints